František Jandl (27 October 1905 – 28 November 1984) was a Czech equestrian. He competed in two events at the 1936 Summer Olympics.

References

External links
 

1905 births
1984 deaths
Czech male equestrians
Olympic equestrians of Czechoslovakia
Equestrians at the 1936 Summer Olympics
Place of birth missing